Chelsea Abdullah is a Kuwaiti-American writer. She is the author of the fantastical Sandsea Trilogy.

Early life and education 

Abdullah was born and raised in Kuwait. She earned an MA in English from Duquesne University. She graduated from the University of Colorado Boulder.

Career 
In 2022, Abdullah published her debut novel, the first of an intended trilogy. Titled The Stardust Thief, it's a story that takes place in a One Thousand and One Nights-inspired fantasy world where jinn are persecuted and hunted for their healing blood, and their enchanted relics are coveted. Publishers Weekly praised Abdullah's "lush descriptions [that] bring the setting to life" and her ability to create a "sense of mystery and enchantment". The New Arab applauded her inclusion of traditional Emirati folk tales and said she "beautifully [weaves] stories within stories, tales within tales."

The second installment of the trilogy, The Ashfire King, will be published in 2023.

Bibliography 

 The Stardust Thief, Little, Brown Book Group Limited, 2022.

References

External links

Further reading 
 
 

Living people
Year of birth missing (living people)
University of Colorado Boulder alumni
Duquesne University alumni
American fantasy writers
Women science fiction and fantasy writers
21st-century American writers
21st-century American women writers
21st-century Kuwaiti writers
Kuwaiti women novelists
American writers of Arab descent